Finnell is a surname. Notable people with the surname include:

 Charles Finnell, member of the 75th Texas House of Representatives (1997–1999) for District 80
 Howard Finnell (1894–1960), American agronomist and erosion specialist
 Michael Finnell (born 1955), American film producer
 Woolsey Finnell, namesake of the Woolsey Finnell Bridge in Alabama and state director of highways

See also
 Fennell